Depew may refer to:

Places
United States
 Depew, Iowa, an unincorporated community
 Depew, Missouri, an unincorporated community
 Depew, New York, a village
 Depew, Ohio, an unincorporated community
 Depew, Oklahoma, a town

People with the surname
Chauncey Depew (1834–1928), American politician and lawyer
Hap Depew (1887–1940), American cinematographer
Joseph Depew (1912–1988), American actor and director